Edward Sidney Devereaux (27 August 192517 December 2003), better known professionally as Ed Devereaux, was an Australian actor, director, and scriptwriter who lived in the United Kingdom for many years. He was best known for playing the part of Matt Hammond the head ranger in the Australian television series Skippy the Bush Kangaroo. He was also involved in the series behind the scenes, Devereaux writing the script and directing the episode The Veteran (1969), for which he received much critical acclaim. Devereaux based the story of the episode "Double Trouble" on an idea conceived by his children, wrote the screenplay of "Summer Storm" and the script for "The Mine". He also played the part of Joe in the Australian 1966 film ‘They’re a Weird Mob’. The film was a local success.

Biography
He had been a boy soprano, teenage soldier in New Guinea during the Second World War, cabbie, storeman and truck driver before moving to the UK in 1950.

Devereaux appeared as Mr. Gubbins in the 1963 British comedy film Ladies Who Do and in several Carry On films including Carry On Sergeant, Carry On Nurse, Carry On Regardless and Carry On Jack.

He also appeared as Thomas Macaulay in series five of The Onedin Line, as Lord Beaverbrook in both Edward & Mrs. Simpson and The Life and Times of David Lloyd George, and as Mac in the British comedy series Absolutely Fabulous and in The Professionals (episode "Runner") and The Sweeney ("Jackpot"). In 1964 he appeared in The Saint episode "The Loving Brothers". In 1970 he played the villain in The Persuaders ! episode "Anyone Can Play".

Australian TV roles included the title role of Jack Meredith in My Brother Jack (ABC-TV, 1965), and George King in Kings (1983). He also received critical acclaim, including the AACTA Award for Best Lead Actor in a Television Drama, for his role as Australian Prime Minister Ben Chifley, in the ABC TV mini series The True Believers (1988).

Personal life 

Devereaux's first wife was Rene (Irene) Champion. Together they had four children: John (b. 1954), Steven (b. 1955), Timothy (b. 1956) and Matthew (b. 1962). Champion wrote the song for the Skippy spin-off film The Intruders in 1969. The couple had experienced a marital separation sometime before their 1986 divorce, when Devereaux married his second wife, Julie.

Death 
Three months after he was diagnosed with cancer of the oesophagus, Devereaux died in his sleep of kidney failure at his Hampstead home on 17 December 2003 at the age of 78. He had insisted on being released from Royal Free Hospital to be at home with wife Julie. He was cremated at the Golders Green Crematorium, where his ashes remain.

Selected filmography

 Little Red Monkey (1955) - American Sailor (uncredited)
 The Shiralee (1957) - Christy
 Carry On Sergeant (1958) - Sergeant Russell
 Floods of Fear (1958) - National Guard #2
 The Captain's Table (1959) - Brickwood
 Carry On Nurse (1959) - Alec Lawrence
 Bottoms Up (1960) - Policeman (uncredited)
 The Savage Innocents (1960) - Pilot
 There Was a Crooked Man (1960) - American Colonel
 Watch Your Stern (1960) - Cmdr. Phillips
 Man in the Moon (1960) - Storekeeper
 Carry On Regardless (1961) - Mr. Panting
 Very Important Person (1961) - Webber (uncredited)
 Carry On Cruising (1962) - Young Officer
 Mix Me a Person (1962) - Supt. Malley
 The Password Is Courage (1962) - Aussie
 The Wrong Arm of the Law (1963) - Bluey May
 Heavens Above! (1963) - Communications Officer (uncredited)
 Ladies Who Do (1963) - Mr. Gubbins
 Live It Up! (1963) - Herbert Martin
 Carry On Jack (1963) - Hook, Pirate
 The Bargee (1964) - Boat Man (uncredited)
 Never Put It in Writing (1964) - Pringle
 My Brother Jack (1965) - David Meredith
 They're a Weird Mob (1966) - Joe Kennedy
 Journey Out of Darkness (1967) - Jubbal
 The Intruders (1969) - Matt Hammond, Head Ranger
 Game, Set and Match - Currie
 Nickel Queen (1971) - Harry Phillips
 Anyone can play - Ryker
 Bless This House (1972) - Jim
 Fall of Eagles  (1974) - Purtales
 Barry McKenzie Holds His Own (1974) - Sir Alec Ferguson
 The Sweeney   (1975) - Harry Biggleswade
 To the Devil a Daughter (1976) - Reporter (uncredited)
 Pressure (1976) - Police Inspector
 Three Dangerous Ladies (1977) - Ferryman (segment "The Island")
 Money Movers (1978) - Dick Martin
 Robbery Under Arms (1985) - Ben
 Claudia (1985) - George
 Reunion at Fairborough (1985) - George Klass
Goldeneye: The Secret Life of Ian Fleming (1989) - Sir William Stephenson 
 I Bought a Vampire Motorcycle (1990) - Landlord
 Buddy's Song (1991) - Bookie

References

External links

1925 births
2003 deaths
AACTA Award winners
Australian male film actors
Australian male television actors
Male actors from Sydney
Deaths from cancer in England
Golders Green Crematorium
Australian emigrants to England